Harttia longipinna is a species of armored catfish of the family endemic to Brazil where it is found in the upper São Francisco River basin.  This species grows to a length of  SL.

References 
 

longipinna
Catfish of South America
Fish of the São Francisco River basin
Endemic fauna of Brazil
Taxa named by Francisco Langeani-Neto
Taxa named by Osvaldo Takeshi Oyakawa
Taxa named by Juan Ignacio Montoya-Burgos
Fish described in 2001